Aisha Gurbani (born 28 April 1993) is an Azerbaijani judoka.

She represented Azerbaijan at the 2020 Summer Olympics. She competed in the women's 48 kg event.

References

External links
 

1993 births
Living people
Azerbaijani female judoka
European Games competitors for Azerbaijan
Judoka at the 2015 European Games
Judoka at the 2019 European Games
Islamic Solidarity Games medalists in judo
Islamic Solidarity Games competitors for Azerbaijan
Judoka at the 2020 Summer Olympics
Olympic judoka of Azerbaijan
21st-century Azerbaijani women